The Men's 4x100 Medley Relay swimming event at the 2009 SEA Games was held in December 2009.

Results

Final

References

Swimming at the 2009 Southeast Asian Games